The Slovenian Navy, officially the 430th Naval Division is not a separate service, but an integral part of the Slovenian Armed Forces.

History
The Slovenian navy was created after independence in 1991, as the Territorial Defense Forces of Slovenia had not been equipped with any maritime assets. No significant action of the Ten-Day War occurred at sea. In 1991, a small diving detachment was formed in Ankaran, equipped with sport-diving equipment because of the UN arms embargo against the former Yugoslav republics.

The 430th Naval Division was officially created in 1993. After the embargo was lifted in 1996, Slovenia purchased a single Israeli-built IAI-Ramta Super Dvora Mk2-class patrol boat, which was named Ankaran after the coastal town. In 2008, the Ministry of Defense announced that Slovenia would procure one Russian Project 10412 patrol boat, offered in payment of a multimillion-dollar debt owed to Slovenia. The vessel was subsequently named Triglav, after the mountain and national symbol. Specially equipped for Slovenian needs, it is optimized for a patrol role and lacks the anti-ship missiles of the version in service with the Russian Navy, instead mounting two rigid-hulled inflatable boats. In June and August 2015 both ships underwent overhaul in Trieste shipyard.

Equipment

Deployments
The Slovenian patrol ship  was sent to east Sicily in late 2013 to assist Italy with migrants from North Africa, as a part of Operation Mare Nostrum. In October 2015, Triglav was sent to southern Italy as a part of the European Union's Operation Sophia.

References

 
Slovenian Armed Forces
Navies by country
Navy